This article is about the particular significance of the year 1865 to Wales and its people.

Incumbents

Lord Lieutenant of Anglesey – Henry Paget, 2nd Marquess of Anglesey 
Lord Lieutenant of Brecknockshire – John Lloyd Vaughan Watkins (until 28 September) George Pratt, 2nd Marquess Camden (from 4 November)
Lord Lieutenant of Caernarvonshire – Sir Richard Williams-Bulkeley, 10th Baronet 
Lord Lieutenant of Cardiganshire – Edward Pryse
Lord Lieutenant of Carmarthenshire – John Campbell, 2nd Earl Cawdor 
Lord Lieutenant of Denbighshire – Robert Myddelton Biddulph   
Lord Lieutenant of Flintshire – Sir Stephen Glynne, 9th Baronet
Lord Lieutenant of Glamorgan – Christopher Rice Mansel Talbot
Lord Lieutenant of Merionethshire – Edward Lloyd-Mostyn, 2nd Baron Mostyn 
Lord Lieutenant of Monmouthshire – Benjamin Hall, 1st Baron Llanover
Lord Lieutenant of Montgomeryshire – Sudeley Hanbury-Tracy, 3rd Baron Sudeley 
Lord Lieutenant of Pembrokeshire – William Edwardes, 3rd Baron Kensington 
Lord Lieutenant of Radnorshire – John Walsh, 1st Baron Ormathwaite
Bishop of Bangor – James Colquhoun Campbell 
Bishop of Llandaff – Alfred Ollivant 
Bishop of St Asaph – Thomas Vowler Short 
Bishop of St Davids – Connop Thirlwall

Events
5 January — The Festiniog Railway officially opens to passengers, the first narrow gauge railway in the British Isles to do so.
14 January — American Confederate paddle steamer Lelia sinks off the north Wales coast with the loss of eighteen lives.
1 February — The Vale of Neath Railway is amalgamated with the Great Western Railway.
14 April
Opening of the Royal Pier, Aberystwyth, built by Eugenius Birch at a cost of £13,600.
Paddle steamer Great Empress collides with Beaumaris Pier.
May 
Opening of Talyllyn Railway.
A branch of The Philanthropic Order of True Ivorites Friendly Society is established and registered at Colwinston.
28 May — The Mimosa sets sail with emigrants for Patagonia.
10 June — Opening of Penarth Dock.
3 July — Opening of Barmouth Junction on the Aberystwith and Welsh Coast Railway. 
28 July — The town of Puerto Madryn and the Patagonian colony is founded by Michael D. Jones.
2 August — The Wales memorial to the late Prince Albert at Tenby, sculpted by John Evan Thomas, is unveiled by Albert and Victoria's 3rd son, 15-year-old Prince Arthur on his first public engagement.
9 September — First of fifteen deaths in the only outbreak of yellow fever ever to occur in Britain, at Swansea.
29 November — Two men die when a coal train falls into the North Dock at Swansea.
1 December — Llandrindod Wells is linked to the rail network for the first time.
20 December — Gethin Pit disaster, Abercanaid: the second of two firedamp explosions at this colliery near Merthyr Tydfil kills 34 miners.
Francis Kilvert becomes curate of Clyro in Radnorshire.
Sale of the Pwyllycrochan estate, leading to the development of Colwyn Bay.
John Crichton-Stuart, Marquess of Bute, meets architect and designer William Burges.
Robert Jones Derfel retires from the ministry and sets up a Welsh bookshop and press in Manchester.

Arts and literature

Awards
National Eisteddfod of Wales is held at Aberystwyth.  The chair is won by Lewis William Lewis (Llew Llwyfo).

New books
Morris Davies — Cofiant Ann Griffiths
John Evans (I. D. Ffraid) — Coll Gwynfa (translation of Milton's Paradise Lost)
John Ceiriog Hughes — Y Bardd a'r Cerddor
John Jones (Mathetes) — Pregeth i Fyfyrwyr Coleg Hwlffordd ...
John Thomas (Ifor Cwmgwys) — Diferion Meddyliol

Music
Thomas Gruffydd Jones (Tafalaw Bencerdd) — Gwarchae Harlech (cantata)

Sport
Cricket
17 July — South Wales Cricket Club travels to Gravesend to play the Gentlemen of Kent.
August — Morriston Cricket Club is founded.

Births
2 February — Henry Davies, cricketer (died 1934)
28 February — Arthur Symons, poet and critic (died 1945)
7 March — Martyn Jordan, Wales international rugby player (died 1902)
30 April — Max Nettlau, German historian and Welsh learner (died 1944) 
3 June — Prince George, second son of the Prince and Princess of Wales and himself Prince of Wales 1901–1910 (later King George V of the United Kingdom; died 1936)
6 August — Lewis Cobden Thomas, Wales international rugby player (died 1928)
22 August — Stephen Thomas Wales international rugby player (died 1937)
8 September — David Williams, Swansea politician (died 1941)
23 September — William Brace, politician (died 1947)
20 October — Sir Rhys Rhys-Williams, 1st Baronet, judge (died 1955)
26 October — Hugh Ingledew, Wales international rugby player (died 1937)
October — Jack Doughty, footballer (died 1937)
16 December — George Rowles, footballer (died 1922)
December — Richard Bagnall-Oakeley, Olympic archer (died 1947)
date unknown 
Dickie Garrett, rugby player (died 1908)
Albert Hybart, rugby player (died 1945)
George Owen, footballer (died 1922)
Robert Roberts, footballer (died 1945)

Deaths
21 February — Stapleton Cotton, military leader, 91
26 April — William Williams, MP, 77
29 April — Thomas Evans (Telynog), poet, 24
18 June — William Parker Foulke, Welsh-descended American geologist, 49
10 August — Hugh Pugh, mariner, 71
28 September — John Lloyd Vaughan Watkins, politician, Lord Lieutenant of Brecknockshire, 63
20 November — Rees Howell Gronow, soldier, politician and memoirist, 70

References

 
Wales